Zehneria alba is a species of flowering plant in the cucumber and gourd family, Cucurbitaceae. It is endemic to Christmas Island, an Australian territory in the northeastern Indian Ocean.  The specific epithet is from the Latin albus (white), referring to the colour of the flowers.

Description
Zehneria alba is a dioecious vine with stems growing to 3 m in length. The leaves are broadly ovate, cordate at the base, unlobed to shallowly 3-lobed, dentate, acute to acuminate, and 50–80 mm long.  The flowers are small and white; the male inflorescence is paniculate or racemose, 30–150 mm long, with a 10–130 mm long peduncle; the female flowers are solitary or clustered.  The fruit is ellipsoidal, 20–30 mm long, with seeds about 4 mm long.

Distribution and habitat
Found only on Christmas Island, the vine grows there both within the rainforest and along its shrubbed edges.

Taxonomy
The vine is sometimes considered to be conspecific with Zehneria mucronata Blume.

References

Notes

Sources
 
 

alba
Endemic flora of Christmas Island
Vines
Plants described in 1906
Dioecious plants
Taxa named by Henry Nicholas Ridley